A floating liquefied natural gas (FLNG) facility, is a floating production storage and offloading unit that conducts liquefied natural gas (LNG) operations for developing offshore natural gas resources. Floating above an offshore natural gas field, the FLNG facility produces, liquefied stores and transfers LNG (and potentially LPG and condensate) at sea before carriers ship it directly to markets.

Recent developments in  liquefied natural gas (LNG) industry require relocation of conventional LNG processing trains into the sea to unlock remote, smaller gas fields that would not be economical to develop otherwise, reduce capital expenses, and impact to environment.  Emerging new type of FLNG facilities will be used. Unlike FPSOs apart of gas production, storage and offloading, they will also allow full scale deep processing, same as onshore LNG plant has to offer but squeezed to 25% of its footprint.
The first 3 FLNG's were constructed in 2016: Prelude FLNG (Shell), PFLNG1 and PFLNG2 (Petronas).

History
Studies into offshore LNG production have been conducted since the early 1970s, but it was only in the mid-1990s that significant research backed by experimental development began.

In 1997, Mobil developed an FLNG production concept based on a large, square structure with a moonpool in the center,
commonly known as "The Doughnut".

In 1999, a major study was commissioned as a joint project by Chevron Corporation and several other oil and gas companies. This was closely followed by the so-called 'Azure' research project, conducted by the EU and several oil and gas companies. Both projects made great progress in steel concrete hull design, topside development and LNG transfer systems.

Projects 2010—2020

Royal Dutch Shell 
In July 2009, Royal Dutch Shell signed an agreement with Technip and Samsung allowing for the design, construction and installation of multiple Shell FLNG facilities.

In April 2010, Shell announced that it had been selected to develop the Greater Sunrise gas fields in the Timor Sea, making it Shell's second FLNG facility after Prelude. The project was scheduled to begin processing gas in 2016.

Royal Dutch Shell announced a 12 billion AUD (8.71 billion USD) investment on 20 May 2011 to build Prelude FLNG. Construction began in October 2012.

432 m Coral South FLNG for Mozambic

Petronas 
In February 2011, Petronas awarded a FEED contract for an FLNG unit to a consortium of Technip and Daewoo Shipbuilding & Marine Engineering for a facility in Malaysia. It installed its first FLNG, PFLNG Satu, in the Kanowit gas field off the shore of Sarawak, Malaysia. It loaded its first cargo was onto the 150,200-cbm Seri Camellia LNG carrier on 3 April 2017.

Planned projects 
Petrobras invited three consortiums to submit proposals for engineering, procurement and construction contracts for FLNG plants in ultra-deep Santos Basin waters during 2009. A final investment decision was expected in 2011.

, Japan's Inpex planned to leverage FLNG to develop the Abadi gas field in the Masela block of the Timor Sea, with a final investment decision expected by the end of 2013. Late in 2010, Inpex deferred start-up by two years to 2018 and cut its 'first phase' capacity to 2.5 million tons per year (from a previously proposed capacity of 4.5 million tonnes).

, Chevron Corporation was considering an FLNG facility to develop offshore discoveries in the Exmouth Plateau of Western Australia, while in 2011, ExxonMobil was waiting for an appropriate project to launch its FLNG development.

According to a presentation given by their engineers at GASTECH 2011, ConocoPhillips aimed to implement a facility by 2016–19, and had completed the quantitative risk analysis of a design that would undergo pre-FEED study during the remainder of 2011.

GDF Suez Bonaparte – a joint venture undertaken by the Australian oil and gas exploration company Santos (40%) and the French multi-international energy company GDF Suez (60%) – initialled awarded a pre-FEED contract for the Bonaparte FLNG project offshore Northern Australia. The first phase of the project calls for a floating LNG production facility with a capacity of 2 million mt/year, with a final investment decision is expected in 2014 and startup planned for 2018. However, in June 2014, GDF Suez and Santos Limited made a decision to halt development. A part of the decision included the perception that long-term capabilities of North American gas fields due to hydraulic fracturing technologies and increasing Russian export capabilities would adversely affect the profitability of the venture due to competition.

In October 2016, Exmar NV performance tested a facility designed by Black & Veatch. The facility has a single liquefaction train that can produce 72 million cubic feet a day of LNG.

On 4 June 2018, Golar LNG announced that their FLNG Hilli Episeyo had got a customer acceptance after successfully being tested in 16 days commissioning. FLNG Hilli Episeyo will serve Parenco Cameroon SA in Cameroon's water. FLNG Hilli Episeyo is designed by Black & Veatch and was built in Keppel Shipyard in Singapore.

Fortuna FLNG, to be commissioned in 2020, is owned by a joint venture between Ophir Energy and Golar LNG is under development in Equatorial Guinea.  When operational, it is expected to produce around 2.2 million tonnes per year of gas and to be the first FLNG to operate in Africa.

Challenges
Moving LNG production to an offshore setting presents a demanding set of challenges. In terms of the design and construction of the FLNG facility, every element of a conventional LNG facility needs to fit into an area roughly one quarter the size, whilst maintaining appropriate levels of safety and giving increased flexibility to LNG production.

Once a facility is in operation, wave motion will present another major challenge. LNG containment systems need to be capable of withstanding the damage that can occur when the sea's wave and current motions cause sloshing in the partly filled tanks. Product transfers also need to deal with the effects of winds, waves and currents in the open seas.

Solutions to reduce the effect of motion and weather are addressed in the design, which must be capable of withstanding – and even reducing – the impact of waves. In this area, technological development has been mainly evolutionary rather than revolutionary, leveraging and adapting technologies that are currently applied to offshore oil production or onshore liquefaction. For example, traditional LNG loading arms have been adapted to enable LNG transfers in open water, and hose-based solutions for both side-by-side transfers in calmer seas and tandem transfers in rougher conditions are nearing fruition.

Advantages

Among fossil fuels, natural gas is relatively clean burning. It is also abundant, and has been affordable most of the time. It may be able to meet some of the world's energy needs by realising the potential of otherwise unviable gas reserves (several of which can be found offshore North West Australia). FLNG technology also provides a number of environmental and economic advantages:

 Environmental - Because all processing is done at the gas field, there is no need to lay long pipelines all the way to the shore. There is also no requirement for compression units to pump the gas to shore, dredging and jetty construction or the onshore construction of an LNG processing plant, all of which significantly reduce the project's environmental footprint. Avoiding construction also helps preserve marine and coastal environments. Additionally, environmental disturbance would be minimised during the later decommissioning of the facility, because it could be disconnected easily and removed before being refurbished and re-deployed elsewhere.
 Economic – Where pumping gas to shore can be prohibitively expensive, FLNG makes development economically viable. As a result, it will open up new business opportunities for countries to develop offshore gas fields that would otherwise remain stranded, such as those off the coast of East Africa. FLNG is also conducive to side stepping complexities involving neighboring countries where disputes would make pipelines vulnerable or impractical such as in Cyprus, Israel and Europe. Moreover, LNG is slowly gaining its role as direct use fuel without regasification with operational cost and least pollution benefits in road, rail, air and marine transport.

Operation
The FLNG facility will be moored directly above the natural gas field. It will route gas from the field to the facility via risers. When the gas reaches the facility, it will be processed to produce natural gas, LPG, and natural gas condensate. The processed feed gas will be treated to remove impurities, and liquefied through freezing, before being stored in the hull. Ocean-going carriers will offload the LNG, as well as the other liquid by-products, for delivery to markets worldwide. The conventional alternative to this would be to pump gas through pipelines to a shore-based facility for liquefaction, before transferring the gas for delivery.

References

 
Natural gas technology